The Berkshire String Quartet was an American classical chamber group founded and funded in 1916 at the height of World War I by Elizabeth Sprague Coolidge.  The quartet, originally, was the Kortschak String Quartet, named for Hugo Kortschak (1884–1957), a member of the Chicago Symphony Orchestra from 1907 until 1914 (serving as assistant concertmaster from 1910 until 1914).  Kortschak was a key figure in organizing the Berkshire Chamber Music Festival founded by Coolidge.  The original Berkshire String Quartet disbanded sometime after 1941.

In July 1948, the successors of the Gordon Quartet were about to disband for a lack of funding and loss of its founder, Jacques Gordon (1897–1948), who had disbanded the quartet in 1947 due to ill health.  Coolidge came to the rescue.  She underwrote enough additional performances to make the quartet's summer season possible.  But, according to Time magazine, Coolidge, for one of the few times in her life, asked a sentimental favor in return.  "Would the quartet please call itself the Berkshire Quartet?" The quartet agreed and, at the urging of Wilfred Bain, moved its permanent residence to the Indiana University School of Music.  The quartet continued to maintain its summer residence at Music Mountain, a hilltop near Falls Village, Connecticut, where, in 1930, Gordon had founded a Chamber Music Festival named after the hilltop.

Former members 
Founding members in 1916, in residence at Pittsfield, Massachusetts
 Hugo Kortschak (1884–1957) (first violin)
 Serge Kotlarsky (1893–1987) (second violin)
 Clarance Evans (viola)
 Emmeran Stoeber (1882–1945) (cello)

Other members at Pittsfield

 Hermann Julius Felber, Jr. ( –1892) (second violin, debut 1917) †
 Émile August Ferir (1873–1949) (viola)
 Edouard Dethier (1885–1962) †
† In 1917, Hermann Felber was drafted into the US Army; Edouard Dethier of New York played in his place.

Successor of the Gordon Quartet beginning in 1948, in residence at Indiana University and Music Mountain

Founding members in 1948

 Urico Rossi (1916–2001) (first violin), formerly a student of Kortschak
 Albert Lazan (1914–2003) (second violin)
 David Dawson ( –1975) (viola)
 Fritz Magg (1914–1997) (cello)

Other members after 1948
 Jerry Horner (1935–2019) (violist from 1975–1976)
 Paul Biss (viola)

See also 
 Zhanna Arshanskaya Dawson, David Dawson's wife

References

External links 
  National Register of Historic Places
 Daniel Gregory Mason:The appreciation of music (Volume 4). (page 5 of 12) The Berkshire Festivals
 The Harlem Valley Times Thursday, March 8,1979 THE SECOND FESTIVAL, 1919 
 MUSIC; The Berkshire String Quartet. Miss Rosalie Miller's Recitals. The New York Times. November 19, 1919
 "CHAMBER MUSIC GIVEN ON MOUNTAIN; Mrs. F.S. Coolidge's Berkshire Festival Begins Before Many Distinguished Musicians", The New York Times. September 26, 1919, 
 The Harvard Crimson January 10, 1920 
 Berkshire Festival of Chamber Music (1918–38)

Musical groups established in 1916
American string quartets
Jacobs School of Music faculty